The rosters for the 1999 FIFA World Youth Championship tournament in Nigeria includes the names of all players.

Group A

Head coach:  Carlos Watson

Head coach:  Bernd Stöber

Head coaches:  Thijs Libregts &  Olatunde Nurudeen Disu

Head coach:  Mario Jacquet

Group B

Head coach:  José Pekerman

Head coach:  Martin Novoselac

Head coach:  Giuseppe Dossena

Head coach:  Vladimir Fomichyov

Group C

Head coach:  Les Scheinflug

Head coach:  Jesús del Muro

Head coach:  Brian Kerr

Head coach:  Pieter Hamberg

Group D

Head coach:  Cho Young-jeung

Head coach:  Mamadou Coulibaly

Head coach:  Jesualdo Ferreira

Head coach:  Víctor Púa

Group E

Head coach:  Ikouam Gweha

Head coach:  Chris Ramsey

Head coach:  Philippe Troussier

Head coach:   Sigi Schmid

Group F

Head coach:  João Carlos

Head coach:  Jose de la Paz Herrera

Head coach:  Iñaki Sáez

Head coach:  Patrick Phiri

References

External links
FIFA.com
Mundial U20 1999 – Ogol

FIFA U-20 World Cup squads
FIFA World Youth Championship